Oley Kiatoneway (born: April 13, 1973, in Nakhon Si Thammarat Province) is a retired Thai Muay Thai fighter and boxer. Former Lumpinee Stadium champion during the golden era of muay thai, he is currently a Muay Thai trainer at the Parunchai camp in Thung Song District.

Biography and career
OLey started training in his native province of Nakhon Si Thammarat as a child. He later joined Kitbanchong gym in Thung Song. He made his debut in Bangkok at 14 and was quickly spotted by the Songchai promotion after a few fights in Omnoi Stadium.

Liked by the public due to his spectacular evasive style, at the peak of his career Kiatoneway's purse reached 250,000 baht making him one of the highest paid fighter of the era.

In professional boxing, he fought a total of 4 bouts, losing 2 times, in the last one he competed for the vacant PABA Super bantamweight title against Russia's Alexander Pak in his native Nakhon Si Thammarat in 1995. Kiatoneway lost by knockout in the first round, although he had a former WBC world Flyweight champion Venice Borkhorsor as a trainer.

Titles and honour

 1990 Lumpinee Stadium 115 lbs Champion (defended once)

Fight record

|-  style="background:#fbb;"
| 1995-03-24 || Loss||align=left| Jomphoplek Sor.Sumalee || Lumpinee Stadium || Bangkok, Thailand || Decision || 5 || 3:00
|-  style="background:#fbb;"
| 1994- || Loss ||align=left| Boonlai Sor.Thanikul || || Thailand || Decision || 5 || 3:00
|-  style="background:#fbb;"
| 1993-12-24|| Loss||align=left| Mathee Jadeepitak || Fairtex, Lumpinee Stadium || Bangkok, Thailand || Decision || 5 || 3:00
|-  style="background:#fbb;"
| 1993-11-30|| Loss ||align=left| Namkabuan Nongkee Pahuyuth || Lumpinee Stadium || Bangkok, Thailand || Decision || 5 || 3:00
|-  style="background:#fbb;"
| 1993-10-05 || Loss||align=left| Therdkiat Sitthepitak || Lumpinee Stadium || Bangkok, Thailand || Decision (Majority) || 5 || 3:00 
|-
! style=background:white colspan=9 |
|-  style="background:#cfc;"
| 1993-08-06 || Win ||align=left| Therdkiat Sitthepitak || Lumpinee Stadium || Bangkok, Thailand || KO (Punches) || 1 ||
|-  style="background:#cfc;"
| 1993-07-11 || Win||align=left| Boonlai Sor.Thanikul || OneSongchai || Nakhon Sawan, Thailand || Decision || 5 || 3:00
|-  style="background:#cfc;"
| 1993-06-11 || Win||align=left| Namkabuan Nongkee Pahuyuth || Lumpinee Stadium || Bangkok, Thailand || Decision || 5 || 3:00
|-  style="background:#cfc;"
| 1993-05-21|| Win ||align=left| Chamuekpet Hapalang || Lumpinee Stadium || Bangkok, Thailand || Decision || 5 || 3:00
|-  style="background:#cfc;"
| 1993-04-24|| Win ||align=left| Superlek Sorn E-Sarn || Lumpinee Stadium || Bangkok, Thailand || Decision || 5 || 3:00
|-  style="background:#cfc;"
| 1993-03-23|| Win ||align=left| Chamuekpet Hapalang || Lumpinee Stadium || Bangkok, Thailand || Decision || 5 || 3:00
|-  style="background:#cfc;"
| 1993-02-05|| Win||align=left| Wangchannoi Sor Palangchai || Lumpinee Stadium || Bangkok, Thailand || Decision || 5 || 3:00
|-  style="background:#cfc;"
| 1992-12-27|| Win||align=left| Dokmaipa Por Pongsawang || Lumpinee Stadium || Bangkok, Thailand || Decision || 5 || 3:00
|-  style="background:#fbb;"
| 1992-12-05|| Loss||align=left| Chamuekpet Hapalang || King's Birthday || Bangkok, Thailand || KO (Punches)|| 4 ||
|-  style="background:#fbb;"
| 1992-10-13|| Loss||align=left| Boonlai Sor.Thanikul || OneSongchai, Lumpinee Stadium || Bangkok, Thailand || Decision || 5 || 3:00
|-
! style=background:white colspan=9 |
|-  style="background:#fbb;"
| 1992-07-21|| Loss ||align=left| Superlek Sorn E-Sarn || Lumpinee Stadium || Bangkok, Thailand|| KO (Punches) || 3 ||
|- style="background:#fbb;"
| 1992-06-30 || Loss||align=left| Boonlai Sor.Thanikul || Lumpinee Stadium || Bangkok, Thailand  || Decision || 5 || 3:00
|-  style="background:#cfc;"
| 1992-05-29|| Win ||align=left| Rittichai Lookchaomaesaitong|| Lumpinee Stadium  || Bangkok, Thailand || Decision || 5 || 3:00
|-  style="background:#cfc;"
| 1992-04-24|| Win ||align=left| Rittichai Lookchaomaesaitong|| Lumpinee Stadium  || Bangkok, Thailand || Decision || 5 || 3:00
|-  style="background:#fbb;"
| 1992-03-10|| Loss ||align=left| Cherry Sor Wanich || Lumpinee Stadium || Bangkok, Thailand || KO (Knees) || 4 ||
|-  style="background:#cfc;"
| 1991-12-27|| Win||align=left| Dokmaipa Por Pongsawang || Lumpinee Stadium || Bangkok, Thailand || Decision || 5 || 3:00

|-  style="background:#cfc;"
| 1991-04-05|| Win ||align=left| Langsuan Panyuthaphum || OneSongchai, Lumpinee Stadium || Bangkok, Thailand || Decision || 5 || 3:00
|-  style="background:#cfc;"
| 1991-03-05|| Win ||align=left| Wangchannoi Sor Palangchai || Lumpinee Stadium || Bangkok, Thailand || Decision || 5 || 3:00
|-  style="background:#fbb;"
| 1991-01-21|| Loss ||align=left| Wangchannoi Sor Palangchai || Rajadamnern Stadium || Bangkok, Thailand || Decision || 5 || 3:00 
|-
! style=background:white colspan=9 |
|-  style="background:#fbb;"
| 1990-12-11|| Loss ||align=left| Namkabuan Nongkee Pahuyuth || Lumpinee Stadium || Bangkok, Thailand || Decision || 5 || 3:00
|-  style="background:#cfc;"
| 1990-11-20 || Win ||align=left| Dedtuang Por.Pongsawang || Lumpinee Stadium || Bangkok, Thailand || Decision || 5 || 3:00
|- style="background:#cfc;"
| 1990-10-07 || Win||align=left| Karuhat Sor.Supawan || OneSongchai || New Zealand  || Decision || 5 || 3:00
|-
! style=background:white colspan=9 |
|-  style="background:#cfc;"
| 1990-09-25|| Win ||align=left| Dokmaipa Por Pongsawang || Lumpinee Stadium || Bangkok, Thailand || Decision || 5 || 3:00
|-  style="background:#fbb;"
| 1990-08-31|| Loss||align=left| Namkabuan Nongkee Pahuyuth || OneSongchai, Lumpinee Stadium || Bangkok, Thailand || Decision || 5 || 3:00
|-  style="background:#cfc;"
| 1990-08-07|| Win ||align=left| Dokmaipa Por Pongsawang || Lumpinee Stadium || Bangkok, Thailand || KO || 3 ||
|-  style="background:#fbb;"
| 1990-07-10|| Loss ||align=left| Dokmaipa Por Pongsawang || OneSongchai, Lumpinee Stadium || Bangkok, Thailand || Decision || 5 || 3:00
|- style="background:#cfc;"
| 1990-06-08 || Win||align=left| Boonlai Sor.Thanikul || Lumpinee Stadium || Bangkok, Thailand  || Decision || 5 || 3:00 
|-
! style=background:white colspan=9 |
|-  style="background:#cfc;"
| 1990-05-18|| Win ||align=left| Seiji Sugawara || MAJKF || Tokyo, Japan || KO (high kick)|| 2 ||
|-  style="background:#fbb;"
| 1990-04-24|| Loss||align=left| Boonlai Sor.Thanikul || OneSongchai, Lumpinee Stadium || Bangkok, Thailand || Decision || 5 || 3:00
|-
! style=background:white colspan=9 |
|-  style="background:#cfc;"
| 1990-04-10|| Win ||align=left| Phanpetch Muangsurin || Lumpinee Stadium || Bangkok, Thailand || Decision || 5 || 3:00
|-  style="background:#cfc;"
| 1990-03-06|| Win ||align=left| Langsuan Panyuthaphum || OneSongchai, Lumpinee Stadium || Bangkok, Thailand || Decision || 5 || 3:00
|- style="background:#cfc;"
| 1990-02-06 || Win ||align=left| Namkabuan Nongkeepahuyuth || Lumpinee Stadium || Bangkok, Thailand  || Decision || 5 || 3:00
|- style="background:#cfc;"
| 1990-01-19 || Win ||align=left| Tanongchai Charoenmuang || Lumpinee Stadium || Bangkok, Thailand  || Decision || 5 || 3:00
|- style="background:#fbb;"
| 1989-11-28 || Loss ||align=left| Karuhat Sor.Supawan || Lumpinee Stadium || Bangkok, Thailand  || Decision || 5 || 3:00
|-  style="background:#cfc;"
| 1989-11-07 || Win ||align=left| Pairojnoi Sor Siamchai || Lumpinee Stadium || Bangkok, Thailand || Decision || 5|| 3:00
|-  style="background:#cfc;"
| 1989-10-06|| Win ||align=left| Phanpetch Muangsurin || Lumpinee Stadium || Bangkok, Thailand || Decision || 5 || 3:00
|-  style="background:#cfc;"
| 1989-09-08 || Win ||align=left| Seesot Sahakanohsot || Lumpinee Stadium || Bangkok, Thailand || KO (Punches) || 1 ||

|-  style="background:#cfc;"
| 1989-08-15 || Win ||align=left| Seksan Sitchomthong || Lumpinee Stadium || Bangkok, Thailand || TKO (Punches) || 2 ||

|-  style="background:#cfc;"
| 1989-07-20 || Win ||align=left| Pennoi Chuwattana || Rajadamnern Stadium || Bangkok, Thailand || KO (Punches) || 1 ||
|-  style="background:#fbb;"
| 1989-05-30|| Loss ||align=left| Petchan Sor.Bodin || Lumpinee Stadium || Bangkok, Thailand || Decision || 5 || 3:00
|-  style="background:#fbb;"
| 1989-04-07 || Loss ||align=left| Puja Sithuanthong || Lumpinee Stadium || Bangkok, Thailand || Decision || 5|| 3:00

|-  style="background:#cfc;"
| 1989-03-10 || Win ||align=left| Makhamlek Sitkhunwaen || Lumpinee Stadium || Bangkok, Thailand || Decision || 5|| 3:00

|-  style="background:#cfc;"
| 1989-02-17 || Win ||align=left| Dejrit Sor.Ploenchit || Lumpinee Stadium || Bangkok, Thailand || Decision || 5|| 3:00
|-  style="background:#fbb;"
| 1988-11-04|| Loss ||align=left| Songchainoi Por.Somjitair || OneSongchai, Lumpinee Stadium || Bangkok, Thailand || KO || 3 ||
|-  style="background:#cfc;"
| 1988-10-11|| Win ||align=left| Kawao Por.Pongkiait || OneSongchai, Lumpinee Stadium || Bangkok, Thailand || Decision || 5 || 3:00

|-  style="background:#fbb;"
| 1988-09-09|| Loss||align=left| Nuathoranee Sitchainarin || OneSongchai, Lumpinee Stadium|| Bangkok, Thailand || Decision || 5 || 3:00
|-  style="background:#cfc;"
| 1988-08-05|| Win||align=left| Nuathoranee Chor Rojanachai || OneSongchai, Lumpinee Stadium|| Bangkok, Thailand || Decision || 5 || 3:00
|-  style="background:#cfc;"
| 1988-05-03|| Win||align=left| Namkabuan Nongkeepahuyuth ||OneSongchai, Lumpinee Stadium|| Bangkok, Thailand || Decision || 5 || 3:00
|-  style="background:#cfc;"
| 1988-|| Win||align=left| Paineung Singpracha ||OneSongchai, Lumpinee Stadium|| Bangkok, Thailand || Decision || 5 || 3:00
|-  style="background:#cfc;"
| 1988-|| Win||align=left| Rungrueng Kiatanan ||OneSongchai, Lumpinee Stadium|| Bangkok, Thailand || KO (High Kick)|| ||
|-  style="background:#fbb;"
| 1987-|| Loss ||align=left| Rungrueng Kiatanan ||OneSongchai, Lumpinee Stadium|| Bangkok, Thailand || Decision || 5 || 3:00
|-  style="background:#cfc;"
| 1987-|| Win ||align=left| Daochai Sakdeeweecha || OneSongchai  || Hat Yai, Thailand || Decision || 5 || 3:00
|-  style="background:#cfc;"
| 1987-|| Win ||align=left| Petchnampeung Chakraphon || OneSongchai, Lumpinee Stadium  || Bangkok, Thailand || TKO || 2 ||
|-  style="background:#cfc;"
| 1987-|| Win ||align=left| Kompichit Singpracha ||OneSongchai, Lumpinee Stadium  || Bangkok, Thailand || Decision || 5 || 3:00
|-  style="background:#cfc;"
| 1987-|| Win ||align=left| Lao Rojanarit || Rangsit Stadium  || Rangsit, Thailand || Decision || 5 || 3:00
|-  style="background:#cfc;"
| 1987-|| Win ||align=left| Chenoi Petchnaka || Omnoi Stadium  || Samut Sakhon, Thailand || KO ||  ||
|-  style="background:#cfc;"
| 1987-|| Win ||align=left| Djamphangoen Prapatmotor || Omnoi Stadium  || Samut Sakhon, Thailand || Decision || 5 || 3:00
|-  style="background:#c5d2ea;"
| 1986-|| Draw ||align=left| Anantadej Singsaithong ||  || Thailand || Decision || 5 || 3:00
|-  style="background:#cfc;"
| 1986-|| Win ||align=left| Danangnoi Sor Meandee ||  || Thailand || Decision || 5 || 3:00
|-  style="background:#cfc;"
| 1986-|| Win ||align=left| Phetlek Jor Kiet Gym ||  || Thailand || Decision || 5 || 3:00
|-  style="background:#cfc;"
| 1986-|| Win ||align=left| Anantasak Singkohyuan ||  || Thailand || Decision || 5 || 3:00
|-  style="background:#cfc;"
| || Win ||align=left| Daoden KietineeGym ||  || Thailand || Decision || 5 || 3:00
|-  style="background:#cfc;"
| || Win ||align=left| Kwanyuen Dechawalit ||  || Thailand || Decision || 5 || 3:00
|-  style="background:#cfc;"
| || Win ||align=left| Huahinlek Lukrawee ||  || Thailand || Decision || 5 || 3:00
|-  style="background:#cfc;"
| || Win ||align=left| Pajonsuk Kietidanpleung ||  || Thailand || Decision || 5 || 3:00
|-
| colspan=9 | Legend:

References

1973 births
Living people
Oley Kiatoneway
Kiatoneway Oley
Oley Kiatoneway
Super-bantamweight boxers
Oley Kiatoneway